Mariano Martín Alonso (20 October 1919 – 9 September 1998) was a Spanish footballer who played as a striker.

Club career
Martín was born in Dueñas, Palencia. After his beginnings with Peña Font, already in Barcelona, he joined FC Barcelona in 1939, proceeding to become one of the club's most prolific scorers; during his nine seasons at Barcelona, he netted 128 times in only 150 matches, including 30 in 23 contests in his fourth season, although Barça finished in third place.

In early 1944, whilst appearing in a friendly match for Catalonia, Martín suffered a severe knee ligament injury, from which he never fully recovered. However, as he played in only 29 La Liga games in his last three seasons combined, he still managed to score on 14 occasions.

Martín closed out his career in 1952, after one year apiece with Gimnàstic de Tarragona and Real Zaragoza and as many with his second club, UE Sant Andreu. He died at almost 79, still living in Catalonia (Cabrils).

International career
Martín earned three caps for Spain, during four years. His debut came on 12 April 1942 in Milan, during a 1–1 friendly draw with Germany.

Club statistics

Honours

Club
La Liga: 1944–45
Copa del Generalísimo: 1942

Individual
La Liga: Top Scorer 1942–43

References

External links

1919 births
1998 deaths
Sportspeople from the Province of Palencia
Spanish footballers
Footballers from Castile and León
Association football forwards
La Liga players
Segunda División players
UE Sant Andreu footballers
FC Barcelona players
Gimnàstic de Tarragona footballers
Real Zaragoza players
Spain international footballers
Pichichi Trophy winners
Catalonia international guest footballers